The 2021–22 Xavier Musketeers women's basketball team represents Xavier University during the 2021–22 NCAA Division I women's basketball season. The Musketeers, led by third-year head coach Melanie Moore, play their games at the Cintas Center and are members of the Big East Conference.

Roster

Schedule

|-
!colspan=9 style=| Regular season

|-
!colspan=9 style=|Big East tournament

See also
2021–22 Xavier Musketeers men's basketball team

References

Xavier
Xavier Musketeers women's basketball seasons
2021 in sports in Ohio
2022 in sports in Ohio